South Korean boy band iKon released four studio albums, four extended plays, one compilation album, one live album, one single album and eighteen singles.

Albums

Studio albums

Reissues

Compilation albums

Live albums

Extended plays

Single albums

Singles

Other charted songs

Notes

References

Discographies of South Korean artists
Hip hop discographies
Discography
K-pop music group discographies